Grégory Fitoussi (born 13 August 1976) is a French actor best known for appearing in television series such as Spiral, Spin and Mr Selfridge.

Personal life
He was born in Paris to Pied-Noir Sephardi Jewish parents. His parents opened a clothing store in Paris managed by his mother, while his father designed the displays. He appears alongside his brother, Mikaël Fitoussi, in the short film Alliés Nés, roughly based on his own family. He was in a relationship for several years with the actress Anne Caillon. He lives in Saint-Mandé, a high-end commune in the eastern suburbs of Paris.

Career
Fitoussi appeared in the TF1 television soap  in which he played Benjamin, the husband of the character .

Fitoussi had one of the lead roles in seasons 1-5 of French police procedural drama , known in English as Spiral, where he played prosecutor/advocate Pierre Clément alongside Caroline Proust as Chief Inspector Laure Berthaud.

In 2012 and 2014, Fitoussi played spin doctor Ludovic Desmeuze in France 2's politics thriller Les Hommes de l'ombre (Spin in English-speaking countries). The series has won acclaim in the United Kingdom where it began to air in 2016 as part of the Walter Presents service on Channel 4's All 4 platform. Its third and final season aired in 2016 in France and in 2017 in the UK. It was also broadcast internationally on the TV5Monde channels.

Between 2013 and 2015, Fitoussi appeared as Henri Leclair in 24 episodes of ITV's Mr Selfridge.

In 2015, he appeared as Luc Girard in the NBC drama series American Odyssey.

In 2018, it was announced that he would join the cast of season 2 Sky Atlantic's Riviera

Filmography

Film

Television

Awards and nominations

References

 

1976 births
20th-century French Sephardi Jews
21st-century French Sephardi Jews
Jewish French male actors
French people of Algerian-Jewish descent
Living people
Male actors from Paris
French male television actors
French male film actors